Miss International 2008, the 48th Miss International pageant, was held on November 8, 2008 at The Venetian Macao in Macau, the presenters are Eric Tsang, Dodo Cheng, Astrid Chan. 63 contestants from all over the world competed for the crown, marking the biggest turnout in the 48 years of the pageant, surpassing the previous of 61 during last year pageant. The contestants also paid a visit to Hong Kong, Tokyo. Miss International 2007, Priscila Perales of Mexico, crowned her successor Alejandra Andreu of Spain as the new Miss International.

Results

Placements

Special awards

Contestants

Notes

Returns

Last competed in 1992:
 
Last competed in 1996:
 
Last competed in 2004:
 
 
Last competed in 2005:
 
 
 
Last competed in 2006:

Withdrawals

References

External links
 Miss International official website

2008
2008 in Macau
2008 beauty pageants
Beauty pageants in Macau